World News Tonight may refer to:

 ABC World News Tonight, the daily evening program of ABC News
 Sky World News Tonight, a former Sky News program
 World News Tonight, formerly the name used for the late edition of SBS World News
 PTS World News Tonight, a Public Television Service program

See also
 World News Today, a news program on BBC World News